Hikayat Abu Samah is a Betawi literature. It is a script which adapted from Malay literature, an Islamic Legend.

References

Malay-language literature
Jawi manuscripts
History of Islam